Salladasburg is a borough in Lycoming County, Pennsylvania, United States. The population was 252 at the 2020 census, making it the smallest borough in Lycoming County. It is part of the Williamsport, Pennsylvania Metropolitan Statistical Area.

Salladasburg is located on Larrys Creek, at the confluence of the Second Fork of Larrys Creek. It is also located at the intersection of Pennsylvania Route 287 and Pennsylvania Route 973.

History
Salladasburg was laid out by Jacob P. Sallada in 1837. He started the town with lots for homes and built a church for use by Lutherans and Presbyterians only. The population of Salladasburg was 374 as of the 1890 census and is now set at just 238 residents. The borough had a number of stores and shops, one hotel, a gristmill, and tannery. There were two schools and three churches. Salladasburg was incorporated as a borough by the Court of Quarter Sessions of the Peace of Lycoming County, Pennsylvania on January 12, 1884.

Geography
Salladasburg is located at  (41.277733, -77.225907). It is surrounded by Mifflin Township.

Demographics

As of the census of 2000, there were 260 people, 105 households, and 70 families residing in the borough. The population density was 333.7 people per square mile (128.7/km2). There were 113 housing units at an average density of 145.0 per square mile (55.9/km2). The racial makeup of the borough was 99.23% White, and 0.77% from two or more races.

There were 105 households, out of which 30.5% had children under the age of 18 living with them, 48.6% were married couples living together, 13.3% had a female householder with no husband present, and 33.3% were non-families. 25.7% of all households were made up of individuals, and 7.6% had someone living alone who was 65 years of age or older. The average household size was 2.48 and the average family size was 2.99.

In the borough the population was spread out, with 27.7% under the age of 18, 7.7% from 18 to 24, 28.1% from 25 to 44, 21.9% from 45 to 64, and 14.6% who were 65 years of age or older. The median age was 36 years. For every 100 females there were 92.6 males. For every 100 females age 18 and over, there were 93.8 males.

The median income for a household in the borough was $30,000, and the median income for a family was $32,500. Males had a median income of $26,458 versus $28,125 for females. The per capita income for the borough was $16,122. About 11.8% of families and 14.9% of the population were below the poverty line, including 21.4% of those under the age of eighteen and 9.5% of those sixty five or over.

See also
History of Lycoming County, Pennsylvania

References

Further reading
 
 

Boroughs in Lycoming County, Pennsylvania
Populated places established in 1837
1837 establishments in Pennsylvania